Theodosiopolis or Theodosioupolis ("city (polis) of Theodosius") can refer to several cities of classical antiquity (re)named after emperor Theodosius:

In Europe
 Panion in Thrace, modern Barbaros in Turkey

In Asia
 Erzurum in Turkey
 Perperene, located today near Bergama in Turkey
 Euaza in the region of Ephesus, located today in Turkey
 Resaina, the modern Ras al-Ayn in Syria

In Africa
 Theodosiopolis in Arcadia in Lower Egypt
 Tebtunis in Lower Egypt
 Hebenu in Upper Egypt